Dongwang may refer to the following locations in China:

 Dongwang, Dingzhou (东旺镇), town in Hebei
 Dongwang, Ningjin County, Hebei (东汪镇), town
 Dongwang, Xingtai County (东汪镇), town in Hebei
 Dongwang, Xinle (东王镇), Hebei
 Dongwang Township, Hebei (东旺乡), in Quyang County
 Dongwang Township, Yunnan (东旺乡), in Shangri-La County